The Proportional Representation Society of Australia is an electoral reform organisation in Australia. It has branches in South Australia, Victoria-Tasmania, New South Wales, Western Australia and the Australian Capital Territory. Its membership includes people that have successfully promoted electoral reform.

The Society regularly reviews and makes submissions on electoral reform within Australia with a focus on multi-member single transferable vote – proportional representation voting systems.  It has made submissions to international organizations including the United Nations and the New Zealand Parliament.

History

The Society's began before the commencement of Australia as a Federation with Catherine Helen Spence as one of its founding members. See details of the growth and success of quota-preferential proportional representation in Australia, particularly at the national level.

Catherine Helen Spence's 1861 booklet, A Plea for Pure Democracy, helped the early formation of a proportional representation group called the 'Effective Voting League of South Australia'. Miss Catherine Spence was the first female candidate at a public election in the then British Empire when she stood unsuccessfully at the 1897 election (under the multiple vote) for the 1897 Australasian Federal Convention.

A statue in Light Square in Adelaide, unveiled on 10 March 1986 by Her Majesty the Queen, commemorates Spence. The PRSA later launched its reprint of her booklet there. She is remembered by her autobiography, and was depicted on the Australian $5 banknote issued for the Centenary of Federation, in 2001. The PRSA's SA Branch (the Electoral Reform Society of South Australia) influenced the replacement of the first party list system used, briefly, for Australian parliamentary elections, introduced by the Dunstan Labor Government in 1973, by direct election using the present quota-preferential form of proportional representation that the SA Electoral Act 1985 prescribes for elections for SA's Legislative Council. The SA Constitution Act 1934 requires a referendum before either House can be abolished, but does not specify or entrench the electoral system.

Advocacy
The Society advocates the use of Hare-Clark proportional voting, a form of the Single Transferable Vote method (STV) that is currently in use for elections in Tasmania and the Australian Capital Territory.

It has published a quarterly newsletter entitled Quota Notes.

The Society has also published educational documents and aids such as
 Rules for Counting Single Transferable Votes
 The Gerrymander Wheel, a simple calculator to demonstrate the perceived futility of drawing geographical boundaries in a single-member electorate system.

Issues
The Society has raised issues in relation to the conduct of public elections in Australia, which include:
 Robson Rotation, the need to randomly order candidates' listings in the printing of ballot papers so as to minimize the effect of donkey voting
 The rules for the calculation of the surplus transfer value in the distribution of preferences in proportional representation counts.
 Opposition to the voting device imposed on certain Australian proportional representation elections
 Filling casual vacancies by countback, which is a form of direct election, rather than by the party appointment system used to fill Senate and Legislative Council casual vacancies.
 Electronic voting, and the introduction and use of computer technology in the conduct of elections

Submissions to Government
The Proportional Representation Society has made submissions to governments which have influenced the development and formation of Australia's electoral systems, as can be seen at its News pages.

Public discussion and forums
The Society holds and participates in public meetings and forums on electoral reform in various parts of Australia.  There is a 2009 presentation by Malcolm Mackerras, an electoral analyst and political journalist.

Vote-counting Service
The Proportional Representation Society's Victoria-Tasmania Branch also provides services in counting votes or fully conducting elections for corporate and community organizations in Australia including economical computations of results by email. See its list of clients.

Associations
The Society maintains a connection with:
 The Electoral Reform Society
 STV Action UK
 The Center for Voting and Democracy USA
 Fair Vote Canada
 Fair Voting British Columbia

References and footnotes

External links
 Official PRSA Web site
 Proportional Representation Society of Australia (NSW)
 Proportional Representation Society of Australia (SA)
 Elections and Representative government and representation – Australia  National Library of Australia Archives
 Growth details
 
 Quota Notes
 News pages
 2009 presentation
 Malcolm Mackerras
 List of clients

Psephology
Elections in Australia